The Battle of Tara was fought between the Gaelic Irish of Meath, led by Máel Sechnaill mac Domnaill, and the Norse Vikings of Dublin, led by Amlaíb Cuarán. It took place near the Hill of Tara in Ireland in the year 980. The battle was a devastating defeat for the Vikings and led to the Irish regaining control of Dublin.

Description
On one side there was a Norse army from the Kingdom of Dublin supported by troops from the Hebrides, which was commanded by a son of Olaf Cuaran named Ragnall. The other side was led by Máel Sechnaill mac Domnaill, who had recently come to power as head of the southern Uí Néill. The latter's force consisted of troops from his home province of Mide (the Kingdom of Meath), probably with strong support from troops from Leinster and Ulster.

The battle ended in a devastating defeat for the Norse of Dublin. Olaf abdicated and died in religious retirement in Iona. Dublin was besieged by the victorious Máel Sechnaill, who forced it to surrender slaves and valuables, as well as give up all its prior claims to Uí Néill-held territory. In the following decade, Dublin was more or less under the control of Máel Sechnaill and the Southern Uí Néill.

The Battle of Tara is regarded as a far more decisive defeat for the Norse of Dublin than the later, and much more famous, Battle of Clontarf. Olaf Cuaran was the last of the great Norse kings in Ireland, and following him the status of the Kingdom of Dublin was never the same again.

Location 
The battle took place near the Hill of Tara in Ireland, which is an ancient ceremonial burial site and the location of the Lia Fáil (Stone of Destiny) which was a place of inauguration and the seat of power for the High Kings of Ireland. It is assumed by historians that the defence of this sacred site, which also appears in Irish mythology, against the foreign Norse Vikings would have been a rallying point for many local Irishmen.

Causes 
There are very few records from this period in time so it is not possible to identify all of the causes for the Battle of Tara. However, it is possible to state that combat between minor Irish kings was common in this time period and that about a year prior to this battle an obvious 'casus belli' was the kidnapping (for ransom) of the King of Leinster by the foreign viking king of Dublin:

 Annals of the Four Masters: M977.8 "Domhnall Claen, King of Leinster, was taken prisoner by the foreigners of Ath-cliath (Dublin)."
Annals of Tigernach: T979.2 "Domhnall Claon, king of Leinster, was captured by the Foreigners of Dublin."

Primary Sources 
There are three contemporaneous accounts of the battle: recorded in the :

 Annals of Ulster: M978.3 "The battle of Teamhair was gained by Maelseachlainn, son of Domhnall, over the foreigners of Ath-cliath and of the Islands, and over the sons of Amhlaeibh in particular, where many were slain, together with Raghnall, son of Amhlaeibh, heir to the sovereignty of the foreigners; Conamhail, son of Gilla-Arri; and the orator of Ath-cliath; and a dreadful slaughter of the foreigners along with them. There fell also in the heat of the battle Braen, son of Murchadh, royal heir of Leinster; Conghalach, son of Flann, lord of Gaileanga, and his son, i.e. Maelan; Fiachna and Cuduilich, the two sons of Dubhlaech, two lords of Feara Tulach; and Lachtnan, lord of Mughdhorn-Maighen. After this Amhlaeibh went across the sea, and died at I-Coluim-Cille."

 Annals of the Four Masters: M979.6 "A great army was led by Maelseachlainn, son of Domhnall, King of Ireland, and by Eochaidh, son of Ardgar, King of Ulidia, against the foreigners of Ath-cliath; and they laid siege to them for three days and three nights, and carried thence the hostages of Ireland, and among the rest Domhnall Claen, King of Leinster, and all the hostages of the Ui-Neill. Two thousand was the number of the hostages, besides jewels and goods, and the freedom of the Ui- Neill, from the Sinainn to the sea, from tribute and exaction. It was then Maelseachlainn himself issued the famous proclamation, in which he said:— "Every one of the Gaeidhil who is in the territory of the foreigners, in servitude and bondage, let him go to his own territory in peace and happiness." This captivity was the Babylonian captivity of Ireland, until they were released by Maelseachlainn; it was indeed next to the captivity of hell."
Annals of Tigernach: T980.3 "The battle of Tara gained by Maelseachnaill the Great son of Domhnall son of Donnchadh son of Flann, by the king of Ireland, over the Foreigners of Dublin, over the sons of Olaf specially, wherein many fell, including Raghnall son of Olaf, crown prince of the Foreigners, and Conmael, son of Giolla (Airi) and the Orator of Dublin, and many others. Braen son of Murchadh, crown prince of Leinster, and Congalach son of Flann, king of the Gailenga, and his son Maelán, and Fiachra and Cú Duiligh, two sons of Dublaech, two kings of the Fir Tulach, and Lachtna, king of Mughdoirn Maigen, fell in the counterblow of that battle."

 Annals of Tigernach: T980.4 "A great hosting by Maelseachnaill the Great son of Domhnall, king of Tara, and by Eochaidh son of Ardghal, king of the Ulaid, to the Foreigners of Dublin, and they beleaguered them for three days and three nights, and brought thence the hostages of Ireland, including Domhnall Claon, king of Leinster, and the guarantees of the Uí Néill besides, and they got their full demand from the Foreigners, to wit, two thousand kine, with jewels and treasures, and moreover with the freedom of the Uí Néill from tribute, from the Shannon to the sea. Tis then that Maelseachnaill proclaimed the famous rising when he said: ‘Let every one of the Gaels who is in the Foreigner's province come forth to his own country for peace and comfort.’ That captivity was the Babylonian captivity of Ireland; twas next to the captivity of Hell."

See also 
Battle of Clontarf
Battle of Confey
Early Medieval Ireland 800–1166
Irish battles

References

Bibliography 
 The Annals of the Four Masters
 Donnchadh Ó Corraín, The Vikings & Ireland

External links 
 Ó Corraín: Vikings & Ireland

Tara
Tara
10th century in Ireland
980s conflicts
980
Viking Age in Ireland
Military history of Ireland
Tara